Mantle is a surname. Notable people with the surname include:

Clive Mantle (born 1957), English actor
Doreen Mantle (born 1926), British actress
Gabe Mantle (born 1975), Canadian drummer
John Mantle (disambiguation), multiple people
Kelly Mantle (born 1976), American drag queen
Larry Mantle (born 1959), American radio host
Mickey Mantle (1931–1995), American baseball player
Peter Mantle (born 1950), actor who now runs actors' agency The Elliott Agency
Anthony Dod Mantle (born 1955), British Cinematographer